Prasad Sinha (26 September 1911 – 14 August 1993) was an Indian cricket umpire. He stood in two Test matches between 1948 and 1952.

See also
 List of Test cricket umpires

References

1911 births
1993 deaths
Place of birth missing
Indian Test cricket umpires